Timothy Day may refer to:

 Timothy C. Day (1819–1869), U.S. Representative from Ohio
 Timothy E. Day (born 1979), American actor